This is a list of foreign players in Liga Panameña de Fútbol. The following players:
have played at least one official game for their respective clubs.
are listed as squad members for the current .
have not been capped for the Panama national team at any level.
includes uncapped players with dual nationality.

In italic: Players currently signed, but have yet to play a league match.

In Bold: Current foreign Primera División de Fútbol Profesional. players and their present team.

Africa (CAF)

Cameroon  
 Bengue Guillaume – Plaza Amador

Equatorial Guinea  
 Rolan De La Cruz – Arabe Unido
 Carlos Bejarano – Arabe Unido

Nigeria  
 Frank Nedu Ejiofor – Tauro FC
 Kizito Obi – Tauro FC

South America (CONMEBOL)

Argentina 
 Gianni Baggini – Chepo FC
 Daniel Brizuela – Tauro FC
 Rodrigo Caballero – Plaza Amador
 Claudio Cáceres – San Francisco F.C.
 Juan Cano – Santa Gema
 Gianfranco Cao – Universitario
 Julio Capretta – Plaza Amador
 Rodrigo Cariara – Atletico Veragüense
 Ruben Cecco – Plaza Amador
 Ariel Celebroni – Chorrillo FC
 Daniel Cragnolini – Tauro FC
 Cristian Fabbiani  – Universitario
 Pablo Gallardo – Tauro FC
 Martín Grioni – Chorrillo FC
 Guillermo Mairana – San Francisco F.C.
 Abel Marcovecchio – Independiente
 Claudio "Gallo" Martinez –
 Diego Myers – Plaza Amador
 Ricardo Oviedo – Chorrillo FC
 Nicolás Parodi – Plaza Amador
 Pablo Romero – Tauro FC, Arabe Unido, San Francisco FC
 Daniel Suárez –
 Victor Suarez – San Francisco F.C., Sporting San Miguelito, Plaza Amador
 Juan Tamburelli – Tauro FC
 Norberto Urbani – Plaza Amador
 Santiago Valdés – Chorrillo FC

Bolivia 
 Daniel Camacho - Independiente

Brazil 
 Felipe Bender Borowski –
 Caio José Milan – Chorillo FC
 Tiago Piaí –
 Leandro Cristian Rodrígues do Amaral "Safira" – Plaza Amador
 Ovidio Dos Santos – Tauro FC
 Flavinho da Silva – Plaza Amador
  Roberto Almeida Da Silva –

Colombia  
 Ferney Agrono – Tauro FC
 Santiago De Alba – San Francisco FC
 Gustavo Alvarez – Arabe Unido
 Alexander Amut- Tauro FC
 Yustin Arboleda – Chorillo FC
 Wanegre Delgado de Armas – 
 Jairo León Arias – San Francisco FC
 José Arias – Alianza FC
 Johann de Ávila – San Francisco FC
 Fredy Arizala – San Francisco FC
 Christian Banguera – Chepo FC
 Manuel Bocanegra – Chepo FC
 Ariel Bonilla – Chorillo, Plaza Amador, Tauro FC
 Álvaro Borja – Atlético Veragüense
 James Cabezas – Tauro Fc
 Lid Carabali – Plaza Amador
 Nilson Castañeda – Tauro FC
 Mauricio Castaño – Alianza
  Johan Cerón – Arabe Unido
 Gustavo Chara – Tauro FC
 Jan Contreras – Tauro FC
 Adalberto Córdoba – Tauro FC
 Rolan de la Cruz – Árabe Unido
 Ánderson Diaz – Atlético Chiriquí
 Jeffrey Díaz – San Francisco FC
 Miguel Duque – Chepo FC
 Javier Dussan – Tauro Fc
 Andres Escobar – Chorillo
 Oliver Fula – UDUniversitario
 Jesus Gamboa – Municipal Chorillo
 Rubén Gamboa – San Francisco FC
 Faber Gil – Arabe Unido 
 Deivis Granados – San Francisco FC, Atletico Chiriqui
 Edwin Grueso – Alianza
 Jorge Henriquez – Chorillo
 Reinel Herrera – Tauro FC
 Ignacio Francisco Herrera – 
 Alejandro Hincapié – Arabe Unido
 Diego Hoyos – Arabe Unido
 Emerson Hurtado – San Francisco FC
 Richard Ibargüen – Tauro FC
 Jose Julio – Atlético Veragüense
 Wilmer Largacha – Sporting San Miguelito
 David Loaiza – Chorillo
 Anderson Lobón – Chepo FC
 Dorian López – Tauro FC, San Francisco FC
 Alberto Manotas – Tauro FC, San Francisco FC  
 Joan Melo – Tauro FC
 Alexander Moreno – Chepo FC
 Carlos Mosquera – Tauro FC
 Johnatan Mosquera – Arabe Unido
 Julian Munoz – Chorillo
 Steven Munoz – Chepo FC
 Jose Murillo – Plaza Amador
 Manuel Murillo – Atletico Nacional
 Pablo César Murillo – Atlético Chiriquí
 Gerardo Negrete – Independiente, Alianza
 Marlon Negrete – San Francisco FC
 William Negrete – San Francisco FC
 Edwin Ocampo Osorio – Municipal Chorillo
 Juan Osorio – Alianza FC
 Miguel Alonso Pacheco – La Previsora (San Francisco FC)
 Jean Carlos Palacios-  Sporting 89 (Sporting San Miguelitto)
 Ezequiel Palomeque – Plaza Amador
 Eder Paredes – Alianza FC
 Cristian Pérez – San Francisco FC
 Luis José Pérez – San Francisco FC
 Robyn Pertuz – Alianza
 Héctor Nazarith – Tauro FC
 Gonzalo Quintero –
 John Wilson Raigosa – Arabe Unido
 Jhonny Ríos – Tauro Fc
 Juan Manuel Rodríguez – La Previsora (San Francisco FC)
 Jhoan Romero – Santa Gema
 Rodrigo Ruiz – Arabe Unido
 Víctor Hugo Saavedra – La Previsora (San Francisco FC)
 Victor Sanchez – Alianza FC
 Jorge Sandoval – Sporting San Miguelito
 Andres Santamaria – Plaza Amador, Atletico Nacional
 Milton Segura – Santa Gema
 Carlos Sierra – Tauro FC
 Alvaro Hernán Silva – Sporting San Miguelito
 Santiago Silvera – Atlético Veragüense
 Jhon Solis- Tauro FC
 Miguel Solis – San Francisco FC
 Varcán Sterling – Tauro FC, San Francisco FC
 Lucas Arias Tirado – Alianza FC
 Miguel Torres – San Francisco FC
 Leandro Trujillo – Municipal Chorillo
  David Uribe – Independiente
 John Valencia – Sporting 89 (Sporting San Miguelitto)
 Juan Carlos Velazco –
 Carlos Vilarete – San Francisco FC
 Jefferson Viveros – San Francisco FC
 Francisco Wittingham -La Previsora (San Francisco FC)
 Pablo Zamora – Alianza FC
 Jorge Zapata – Arabe Unido
 Yezid Zapata – San Francisco FC

Ecuador 
 Pablo Ochoa – Sporting San Miguelito
 Geovanny Salinas – Plaza Amador

Paraguay 
 Julio Castillo – Chepo FC, Plaza Amador
 Diego González - Club Deportivo del Este
 Ramiro Bernal - Club Deportivo del Este
 Víctor Benítez - Club Deportivo del Este
 Lucien Galtier - Club Deportivo del Este
 Fernando Lesme - Club Deportivo del Este

Peru 
 Pablo Cotito Arias –
 Rafael Lecca –
 Raúl Mamani –
 Roger Meoño –
 Juan Pretel – Tauro FC

Uruguay 
 David Uribe - San Francisco FC
 Felipe Villalba - Veraguas CD

Venezuela 
 Daniel Blanco -Plaza Amador
 Jose Peraza – Tauro FC
 Frank Piedrahita – Plaza Amador

North & Central America, Caribbean (CONCACAF)

Belize 
 Ryan Simpson – Atlético Chiriquí
 Woodrow West – Atlético Chiriquí.

Costa Rica 
 Luis Carlos Acuña – Árabe Unido
 Carlos Barahona – Alianza FC
 Luis Corrales – San Francisco FC
 Erick Araya Godines – Atlético Chiriquí
 Wilson Lopez – Alianza FC
 Eddy Basilio Rojas – Árabe Unido

Dominican Republic 
 Erick Ozuna – Árabe Unido
 Jonathan Faña – Árabe Unido
 Miguel Lloyd – Árabe Unido

El Salvador 
 Rusvel Saravia – San Francisco FC

Honduras 
 Maynor Suazo – Atletico Veragüense
 José Reyes – San Francisco FC

Mexico 
 José Luis Navas – Tauro FC
 Felipe Villanueva – La Previsora (San Francisco FC)
 Tomás Villanueva – La Previsora (San Francisco FC)

Nicaragua  
 Juan Barrera – Tauro FC
 Raúl Leguías – Municipal Colon, Sporting San Miguelito, Plaza Amador, Tauro FC, Arabe Unido
 Axel Villanueva – Tauro FC

Asia (AFC)

Japan 
 Yuske Kubota – Plaza Amador 
 Osodo Nobuya – Plaza Amador
 Iroki Ueno – Plaza Amador

Europe (UEFA)

Italy 
 Marcos Casagrande – Arabe Unido
 Giacomo Ratto – Tauro FC

Spain 
 Fernando Murcia – Eurokickers FC
 José Raposeiras – EuroKickers FC
 Ismael Remacha – Plaza Amador
 Michel Salgado – Chorillo

External links
 
 

Liga Panameña de Fútbol
Panama
 
Association football player non-biographical articles